Konrad Ludwig "Conny" Staudinger  (born 15 July 1927) is an Austrian former ice hockey player who competed in the 1956 Winter Olympics.

References

1927 births
Living people
Austrian ice hockey players
Olympic ice hockey players of Austria
Ice hockey players at the 1956 Winter Olympics